The 1960–61 Swedish Division I season was the 17th season of Swedish Division I. Djurgardens IF won the league title by finishing first in the final round.

First round

Northern Group

Southern Group

Final round

External links
 1960–61 season

Swe
Swedish Division I seasons
1960–61 in Swedish ice hockey